The 2007–08 Czech First League, known as the Gambrinus liga for sponsorship reasons, was the fifteenth season of Czech Republic's top-tier of football. The season started on 4 August 2007 and concluded on 17 May 2008.

Teams
Příbram and Slovácko were relegated to the second division after finishing last and second to last, respectively, in the 2006–07 season.

Viktoria Žižkov (as champions) and Bohemians 1905 (as runners-up) were promoted from the second division.

Stadia and locations

Managerial changes

 Bohemians 1905 appointed assistant manager Michal Zach to the position of caretaker manager for the six remaining matches of the season. Following the end of the season, Pavel Hoftych took over.
 Sparta Prague appointed club president Jozef Chovanec to the position of caretaker manager for the two remaining matches of the season. Following the end of the season, Vítězslav Lavička took over.

League table

Results

Top goalscorers

 *play abroad after winter transfer

Czech teams in European competitions
Sparta Prague – UEFA Champions League (eliminated in third qualifying round) & UEFA Cup (eliminated in group stage)
Slavia Prague – UEFA Champions League (eliminated in group stage) & UEFA Cup (round of 32)
FK Mladá Boleslav – UEFA Cup (eliminated in group stage)
FK Jablonec 97 – UEFA Cup (eliminated in second qualifying round)
Slovan Liberec – UEFA Intertoto Cup (eliminated in second round)

See also
 2007–08 Czech Cup
 2007–08 Czech 2. Liga

References 

 Statistics of the 2007-2008 season at iDNES.cz

Czech First League seasons
Czech
1